Alhassan Yahaya Seini is a Ghanaian lawyer, and the former executive director and chairman of the legal aid scheme.

Education 
Seini obtained a Bachelor of Laws degree from the University of Ghana in 1981 and  He is also a member of the Ghana Bar Association.

Occupation 
Seini has worked as a research assistant at the institute of Statistical, Social and Economic Research at the University of Ghana in 1977. He was also the northern regional chairman of the national investigations committee from 1984 to 1990. Seini was a senior partner in law practice at Yelinzo Chambers from 1991. He was an Assistant Director at the Northern Region Legal Aid Scheme from 1996. He later became the Executive Director of the Legal Aid Commission.

Personal life 
Seini is from Tamale in the Northern Region of Ghana.

References 

Year of birth missing (living people)
Dagomba people
Living people
People from Northern Region (Ghana)
20th-century Ghanaian lawyers
University of Ghana alumni
21st-century Ghanaian lawyers